François Brune (born 30 September 1940), whose real name is Bruno Hongre,  is a French author and professor. He contributed to the Monde Diplomatique where he wrote articles about advertisement.

References

1940 births
Living people
French male writers